Prenzlauer Allee is a railway station in the Prenzlauer Berg neighbourhood of Berlin, named after the Prenzlauer Allee road. The station is barrier-free.

History
The station was opened on 1 May 1892 where Prenzlauer Allee crosses the Ringbahn tracks at right angle. It consists of a platform for S-Bahn trains and a clinker brick style reception building, which was damaged in World War II. Unlike other reception buildings of nearby stations, it has been rebuilt in its original condition.

Other services and connections
The station can also be reached via the  line of the Berlin tram network and by BVG bus line 156.

References

Prenzlauer
Prenzlauer Allee
Railway stations in Germany opened in 1892